James T. Horn (born August 29, 1966 in Foreman, Arkansas) is an American country music singer. Horn recorded an album for Curb/Universal in 1997 produced by Wynn Jackson and Steve Keller. A dance mix of the song "If My Heart Had an Ass (I'd Kick It)" was released to clubs to introduce him.

Horn's first radio single, "If Dreams Have Wings", was released on October 29, 1996. Deborah Evans Price of Billboard gave the song a favorable review, writing that "Horn has a very traditional voice, and his catch-in-the-throat delivery perfectly suits the heartfelt lyric." His second single, "Geronimo", was released on September 23, 1997. A music video for the song was directed by Steven R. Monroe and aired on CMT. Its B-side, "Texas Diary", peaked at number 72 on the Billboard Hot Country Singles & Tracks chart.

In 2016 he records the single Glory Bound Train is chosen as song in a TV commercial for the company Multiópticas dedicated to optics and eyewear sale in Spain

Discography

Singles

Music videos

References

1966 births
American country singer-songwriters
Country musicians from Arkansas
Curb Records artists
Living people
People from Little River County, Arkansas
Singer-songwriters from Arkansas